Maire Österdahl (12 February 1927 – 18 April 2013) was a Finnish sprinter. She competed in the women's 4 × 100 metres relay at the 1952 Summer Olympics.

References

External links

1927 births
2013 deaths
Athletes (track and field) at the 1952 Summer Olympics
Finnish female sprinters
Finnish female long jumpers
Olympic athletes of Finland